Tout pour l'amour is a 1933 German musical film directed by Henri-Georges Clouzot and Joe May, which stars Jan Kiepura, Claudie Clèves and Charles Dechamps. It was a French-language version of the film A Song for You. The English-language version is My Song for You (1934).

The film's sets were designed by Werner Schlichting.

Cast
Jan Kiepura as Ricardo Gatti
Claudie Clèves as Lixie
Charles Dechamps as Baron Kleeberg
Lucien Baroux as Charlie
Betty Daussmond as mother
Pierre Magnier as father
Charles Fallot as hotel's doorman
Jean Martinelli as Théo
Colette Darfeuil as sa lady in Monbijou
Anna Lefeuvrier

References

External links

Films of the Weimar Republic
German musical films
1933 musical films
Films directed by Joe May
Films directed by Henri-Georges Clouzot
Films scored by Bronisław Kaper
UFA GmbH films
Operetta films
German multilingual films
Cine-Allianz films
German black-and-white films
1933 multilingual films
1930s French-language films
1930s German films